Alpha-gal may refer to:

 Alpha-galactosidase, an enzyme
 Galactose-alpha-1,3-galactose, a carbohydrate also known as Galili antigen
 Alpha-gal allergy